Alex Lanipekun  (born 7 April 1981) is a British actor. He trained at the Royal Academy of Dramatic Art but left early to join the cast of the BBC drama Spooks as journalist-cum-spy Ben Kaplan, the role for which he is best known.

Early life 

Lanipekun was born in London, during the 1981 Brixton riot.  His father is Nigerian and his mother is of half Italian and half English descent.  When he was four, his parents separated and he moved from Brixton to Finsbury Park.  An only child, he was raised in North London by his single mother, a secondary school music teacher.  He attended Crowland Junior School, St Aidan's Primary School and then Rokesly Junior School, before attaining a financial scholarship to Christ's Hospital School in Horsham, West Sussex.  He then attended Westminster College.  Lanipekun has A-Levels in English, Psychology, History, Drama and Religious Studies.  He then obtained a Grant to study for a BSc in Anthropology at University College London.  After University, he attended the Royal Academy of Dramatic Art as a Grant Student.  He was assisted financially by many Arts Charities and Foundations, including The Actors' Charitable Trust. Lanipekun has a younger brother and sister who live with his father and stepmother in South London.

Career 

At age thirteen, Alex auditioned for the National Youth Music Theatre and became a member, subsequently playing the part of Leroy The Boxer in the musical adaptation of the film Bugsy Malone. At seventeen, he auditioned for the National Youth Theatre, and gained a place.  It was then that he first seriously considered acting as a career.

Lanipekun was a member of the MOBO-nominated Hip-Hop Collective 'ONE'. Originally consisting of members from three different groups, his own, alongside producer Al Shux, and two others made up of friends from the local Secondary Schools, Highgate Wood and St David's and St Katherine's. The group was made up of 12 MC's and Producers, including rappers Pyrelli, Artcha, Sway and Mr Ti2bs. ONE released their only album, Onederful World, in 2001.  They set up their own label to coincide with its release and Lanipekun secured distribution through the label CARGO. ONE were nominated for a MOBO Award after reaching the final of the Unsung Competition for independent artists and although not the final winners, the group's profile had been raised within the music industry and they began to get airplay on major British radio stations.

At this time, Lanipekun was also working as a freelance journalist. Originally joining the Sony Street Team under Dj Semtex, he was given the opportunity to write for their promotional website and eventually for their magazine. He wrote reviews, and advertorials, as well as interviewing many of the Urban Division's roster of Artists. Lanipekun began freelancing more widely and was hired as the Entertainment Editor for Alexander Amosu's online magazine 'ICON' where he worked for eighteen months.

Lanipekun was cast in his first professional acting role after school friend and actor Leo Gregory, suggested him to a casting director. Years later, Alex attended Drama School, but would end up leaving early after being cast in Spooks. The part was his first audition, and after four rounds of meetings, the executives at Kudos decided to award him the part.

In 2007 he won the prestigious Carleton Hobbs Award, joining the BBC Radio Drama Rep during their winter season. To date, he has appeared in over fifty radio drama productions. In 2008 after completing his second season on Spooks, he played the part of Ashley in Apples and Oranges for Channel 4 alongside Nathan Stewart-Jarret. He would return to the series in 2012 as Ashley in New Cross, alongside Russell Tovey. In 2008, Lanipekun also played Eric the Red in Wig Out! at the Royal Court Theatre, by Tarrell McCraney, directed by Dominic Cooke.

In 2009, Lanipekun played Danilo in Dimetos, by Athol Fugard, at the Donmar Warehouse with Jonathan Pryce, directed by Douglas Hodge.  The play was previously last performed in 1976 with Paul Scofield in the title role and Ben Kingsley playing Danilo. The production received mixed reviews, but Charles Spencer of the Telegraph gave the play 5 stars, highlighting the central performances of Pryce and Anne Reid, as well as the young leads, Lanipekun and Holliday Grainger. In series 2 of Jonathan Harvey's comedy Beautiful People, Lanipekun guest starred as the Jamaican personal trainer Tiger. The same year, In series 2 of the BBC's Being Human, Lanipekun guest starred in the opening double episode, playing the character Saul. He then completed roles in the films Clash of the Titans, starring Sam Worthington and Ralph Fiennes, and the British film Blitz, starring Jason Statham and Paddy Considine.

In Autumn 2010, Lanipekun returned to the stage, taking on the character of Laertes in Nicholas Hytner's production of Hamlet at the National Theatre. Alongside Rory Kinnear, David Calder, Claire Higgins and Ruth Negga the play had a sellout run and tour. It then returned to the National and finally ended in April 2011. The production and Alex's performance were critically well received, earning 5 and 4 star reviews across all the major broadsheets. The Telegraph, highlighted Lanipekun's portrayal of Laertes, and the Spectator described his performance as "outstanding". The production was also nominated for Evening Standard and Olivier Awards.

Lanipekun returned to TV, appearing as Benjamin Lightfoot in Series 1 of Death in Paradise starring Ben Miller and Sara Martins and playing the role of Mohammed in the Showtime/Sky Atlantic Series The Borgias, starring Jeremy Irons.  He then completed roles in the films Twenty8k alongside Parminder Nagra, Kirsten Wearing, Jonas Armstrong and Stephen Dillane, and the Tony Krawitz-directed Dead Europe alongside Ewan Leslie.

In Autumn 2012, Lanipekun filmed Way To Go for BBC3 and the regular role of Steve for Comedy Central's new show Big Bad World, alongside Blake Harrison, Caroline Quentin and James Fleet. The series ran in 2013, breaking previous records for  Comedy Central's viewing figures. Also in 2013, Alex guest starred in the Channel 4 comedy series London Irish, then played Michael in the Bafta Award-winning Writer/Director, Debbie Tucker Green's first feature Second Coming, alongside Idris Elba. He then completed filming on the Noel Clarke produced film Legacy. He also returned to theatre, in Geraldine Alexander's play Amygdala, performing for the first time since 2011 on stage at The Print Room in Notting Hill. The reviews were generally positive, with Kate Bassett from The Times writing "Here's hoping that British theatregoers see more of Lanipekun, who is both magnetic and mercurial, switching in a flash between real tenderness and explosive rage".

He can also be heard as the voice of the 'Use Sports' campaign for Nike Asia.

Lanipekun plays the regular role of DC Sean Armitage alongside Kenneth Cranham in the BBC Radio 4, show The Interrogation, written by Roy Williams and directed by Mary Peate. They are currently in their Seventh series.

In 2017, Lanipekun plays the voice of Nil in the PlayStation exclusive game "Horizon Zero Dawn". Nil is on a mission to kill all bandits and calls upon Aloy's help to do so.

In 2018, Alex was part of the great ensemble cast, put together to tell the epic story of Homer's Iliad in Troy: Fall Of A City, playing the role of Pandarus. The show was produced by Netflix/ BBC. 

In 2019, he joined the Sky Atlantic/Sundance Now show Riviera for Season 2, playing the role of Raafi Al-Qadar. The show is the largest on Sky TV, breaking previous records with 20 Million Season Downloads.

Filmography

Film

Television

Theatre

Video games

References

External links
 Alex Lanipekun at the British Film Institute

1981 births
Living people
Black British male actors
Alumni of RADA
English male film actors
English male stage actors
English male television actors
English people of Nigerian descent
English people of Yoruba descent
English people of Italian descent
Yoruba male actors
Male actors from London
21st-century English male actors
National Youth Theatre members
People educated at Christ's Hospital